The 1956 Brooklyn Dodgers edged out the Milwaukee Braves to win the National League title. The Dodgers again faced the New York Yankees in the World Series. This time they lost the series in seven games, one of which was a perfect game by the Yankees' Don Larsen.

Offseason 
 December 9, 1955: Don Hoak, Russ Meyer and Walt Moryn were traded by the Dodgers to the Chicago Cubs for Randy Jackson and Don Elston.
 December 21, 1955: Jack Littrell was purchased by the Dodgers from the Kansas City Athletics.
 December 30, 1955: Pete Wojey was traded by the Dodgers to the Detroit Tigers for Leo Cristante and cash.
 March 2, 1956: Tommy Lasorda was purchased from the Dodgers by the Kansas City Athletics

Regular season 
Don Newcombe won the NL MVP award and the very first Cy Young Award. He was the first pitcher to win the National League MVP and the Cy Young Award in the same season.

During the season, the Dodgers played seven home games at Roosevelt Stadium in Jersey City, New Jersey, as part of owner Walter O'Malley's continued attempts to pressure Brooklyn to allow him to build a new stadium in his preferred location at Flatbush and Atlantic Avenues. The first of these games was on April 19.

Season standings

Record vs. opponents

Opening Day Lineup

Notable transactions 
 April 16, 1956: Tim Thompson was traded by the Dodgers to the Kansas City Athletics for Lee Wheat, Tom Saffell and cash.
 May 14, 1956: Billy Loes was purchased from the Dodgers by the Baltimore Orioles.
 May 15, 1956: Jim Hughes was purchased from the Dodgers by the Chicago Cubs.
 May 15, 1956: Sal Maglie was purchased by the Dodgers from the Cleveland Indians.
 July 4, 1956: Ray Shearer was traded by the Dodgers to the Milwaukee Braves for Jim Frey.
 July 29, 1956: Dale Mitchell was purchased by the Dodgers from the Cleveland Indians.

Roster

Player stats

Batting

Starters by position 
Note: Pos = Position; G = Games played; AB = At bats; H = Hits; Avg. = Batting average; HR = Home runs; RBI = Runs batted in

Other batters 
Note: G = Games played; AB = At bats; H = Hits; Avg. = Batting average; HR = Home runs; RBI = Runs batted in

Pitching

Starting pitchers 
Note: G = Games pitched; IP = Innings pitched; W = Wins; L = Losses; ERA = Earned run average; SO = Strikeouts

Other pitchers 
Note: G = Games pitched; IP = Innings pitched; W = Wins; L = Losses; ERA = Earned run average; SO = Strikeouts

Relief pitchers 
Note: G = Games pitched; W = Wins; L = Losses; SV = Saves; ERA = Earned run average; SO = Strikeouts

1956 World Series

Game 1 
October 3, 1956, at Ebbets Field in Brooklyn, New York

Game 2 
October 5, 1956, at Ebbets Field in Brooklyn, New York

Game 3 
October 6, 1956, at Yankee Stadium in New York City

Game 4 
October 7, 1956, at Yankee Stadium in New York City

Game 5 
October 8, 1956, at Yankee Stadium in New York City

Game 6 
October 9, 1956, at Ebbets Field in Brooklyn, New York

Game 7 
October 10, 1956, at Ebbets Field in Brooklyn, New York

Awards and honors 
National League Most Valuable Player
Don Newcombe
Cy Young Award
Don Newcombe
TSN Pitcher of the Year Award
Don Newcombe

All-Stars 
1956 Major League Baseball All-Star Game
Roy Campanella reserve
Jim Gilliam reserve
Clem Labine reserve
Duke Snider reserve
TSN Major League All-Star Team
Don Newcombe

Farm system

Notes

References 
Baseball-Reference season page
Baseball Almanac season page

External links 
1956 Brooklyn Dodgers uniform
Brooklyn Dodgers reference site
Acme Dodgers page 
Retrosheet

 
Los Angeles Dodgers seasons
Brooklyn Dodgers season
National League champion seasons
Jackie Robinson
1956 in sports in New York City
1950s in Brooklyn
Flatbush, Brooklyn